Blue Spring is an unincorporated community in Randolph County, in the U.S. state of West Virginia.

History
A post office called Blue Spring was established in 1876, the name was changed to Bluespring in 1895, and the post office closed in 1942. The community was named after a nearby spring noted for its blue waters.

References

Unincorporated communities in Randolph County, West Virginia
Unincorporated communities in West Virginia